Tin Tokić (born 29 December 1985) is an Italian-Croatian handballer. Actually he plays in the french club Soultz Bollwiller Handball.

References

1985 births
Living people
Sportspeople from Koper
Italian male handball players
Croatian male handball players
Expatriate handball players
Italian expatriate sportspeople in Spain
Croatian expatriate sportspeople in Spain
Italian expatriate sportspeople in France
Croatian expatriate sportspeople in France
Italian expatriate sportspeople in Romania
Croatian expatriate sportspeople in Romania 
Naturalised citizens of Italy
Mediterranean Games competitors for Italy
Competitors at the 2009 Mediterranean Games